Helcogramma chica, known commonly as the little hooded triplefin, is a species of triplefin blenny in the genus Helcogramma. It was described by Richard Rosenblatt in 1960. This species is found in the Indo-Pacific from the Cocos (Keeling) Islands to the Society Islands in French Polynesia.

References

Little hooded triplefin
Fish described in 1960